Melinopterus is a genus of scarab beetles in the family Scarabaeidae. There are more than 20 described species in Melinopterus.

Species
These 22 species belong to the genus Melinopterus. Some of these were previously members of the genus Aphodius.

 Melinopterus abeillei (Sietti, 1903)
 Melinopterus consputus (Creutzer, 1799)
 Melinopterus femoralis (Say, 1823)
 Melinopterus feryi Rössner, 2018
 Melinopterus gissaricus (Akhmetova & Frolov, 2012)
 Melinopterus guillebeaui (Reitter, 1891)
 Melinopterus imamae (Stebnicka, 1988)
 Melinopterus longipes (Landin, 1949)
 Melinopterus makowskyi (Koshantschikov, 1891)
 Melinopterus maroccanus Rössner, 2018
 Melinopterus prodromus (Brahm, 1790)
 Melinopterus pubescens (Sturm, 1800)
 Melinopterus punctatosulcatus (Sturm, 1805)
 Melinopterus rapax (Faldermann, 1836)
 Melinopterus reyi (Reitter, 1892)
 Melinopterus scuticollis (Semenov, 1898)
 Melinopterus sertavulensis (Pittino, 1988)
 Melinopterus sphacelatus (Panzer, 1798)
 Melinopterus stolzi (Reitter, 1906)
 Melinopterus tingens (Reitter, 1892)
 Melinopterus villarreali (Baraud, 1975)
 Melinopterus wittmeri (Petrovitz, 1975)

References

Scarabaeidae
Scarabaeidae genera
Taxa named by Étienne Mulsant